Defending champion René Lacoste defeated Bill Tilden in the final, 11–9, 6–3, 11–9 to win the men's singles tennis title at the 1927 U.S. National Championships. It was Lacoste's second U.S. Championships singles title and fifth major singles title overall.

Seeds
The tournament used two lists of eight players for seeding the men's singles event; one list of U.S. players and one for foreign players. René Lacoste is the champion; others show in brackets the round in which they were eliminated.

  Bill Tilden (finalist)
  Bill Johnston (semifinals)
  Manuel Alonso (quarterfinals)
  Frank Hunter (semifinals)
  George Lott (first round)
  Richard Norris Williams (first round)
  Lewis White (third round)
  John Doeg (third round)

  René Lacoste (champion)
  Henri Cochet (third round)
  Jean Borotra (quarterfinals)
  Jacques Brugnon (quarterfinals)
  Jean Washer (third round)
  Jack Wright (third round)
  Yoshiro Ohta (second round)
  Ryuki Miki (first round)

Draw

Final eight

Earlier rounds

References

Men's Singles
1927